Hans Meuer was a professor of computer science at the University of Mannheim, managing director of Prometeus GmbH and general chair of the International Supercomputing Conference. In 1986, he became co-founder and organizer of the first Mannheim Supercomputer Conference, which has been held annually but known as the International Supercomputing Conference  since 2001.
 
Hans Meuer served as specialist, project leader, group and department chief during his 11 years at the Jülich Research Centre, Germany. For the following 33 years, he was director of the computer center and professor for computer science at the University of Mannheim, Germany. Since 1998 - 2013, he was the managing director of Prometeus GmbH, a company that runs a series of conferences in fields closely associated with high performance computing.

Hans Meuer studied mathematics, physics and politics at the universities of Marburg, Giessen and Vienna. In 1972, he received his doctorate in mathematics from the Rheinisch Westfälische Technical University (RWTH) of Aachen. Since 1974, he was professor of mathematics and computer science at the University of Mannheim with specialization in software engineering. For more than 20 years, he has been involved intensively in the areas of supercomputing/parallel computing.
 
In 1993, Hans Meuer started the TOP500 initiative together with Erich Strohmaier, Horst Simon and Jack Dongarra.

References

External links
Hans Meuer's Homepage
The International Supercomputing Conference Homepage
ISC Conference Series

German computer scientists
1936 births
2014 deaths
RWTH Aachen University alumni
Academic staff of the University of Mannheim